Shelby County is a county in the western portion of the U.S. state of Ohio. As of the 2020 United States Census, the population was 48,230. Its county seat is Sidney. Its name honors Isaac Shelby, first governor of Kentucky.

Shelby County comprises the Sidney, OH Micropolitan Statistical Area, which is also included in the Dayton-Springfield-Sidney, OH Combined Statistical Area.

History

The Algonquian-speaking Shawnee Native Americans had come into the area in the 18th century, displacing the Ojibwa-speaking Ottawa of the Anishinaabeg, a related language group who moved northwest. The Shawnee were joined by the Iroquois, Seneca and Mingo peoples as well, displaced by colonial encroachment to the east. In 1792 the European-American pioneer John Hardin was killed by the Shawnee in Shelby County. Early settlers named the first county seat of Hardin in his memory.

Shelby County was established in 1819 from Miami County. Its original boundary included Minster and New Bremen; these were included in Auglaize County when it was created in 1848 from Shelby and Allen counties.

Several towns in Shelby County were established by German immigrants. The Miami and Erie Canal, which reached Shelby County in 1841, provided jobs for many of the county's European immigrants. It also changed the way new immigrants traveled to Shelby County from Cincinnati in the south and by 1845, Lake Erie in the north. The actual construction provided the initial boost; the real benefit proved to be the opportunity for increased commerce presented by this new transportation link. The canal brought a business boom which in turn drove farm product prices to previously unknown heights. As German immigrants arrived to work on the canal, on the land, and in the shops, business in Sidney and Shelby County expanded. The Germans' penchant for thrift proved to be a valuable asset to the area's economic and social growth. Sidney's population increased from 713 in 1840 to 1,284 by 1850. During this period, the residents’ national origins went from being almost entirely English, or of English descent, to at least fifty percent German and Alsatian French. There were also many families from England who arrived as immigrants in the 19th century. Those English immigrants were of working class rural origins; it was easier for working-class people to own land in America and by this time parts of the United States also had the practice of universal male suffrage so all men over the age of 18, regardless of property or wealth were allowed to vote. These factors encouraged English immigration, particularly from the villages of Penkridge, Gailey, Lapley, Wheaton Aston, Bishop's Wood, Brewood, Coven, Featherstone, Essington, Four Ashes, Perton, Pattingham, Seisdon, Wombourne, Himley, Swindon and Enville, in south Staffordshire in central England, and for this reason these immigrants were sometimes known as "the Staffordshire settlers".

In 1846, a group of 383 free blacks from Virginia, called the "Randolph Slaves", settled in the county, most at Rumley, Ohio. They had been freed by the 1833 will of Virginia planter John Randolph of Roanoke. He provided money for their transportation and resettlement on land in a free state. Their gaining freedom was delayed by court challenges to Randolph's will, but the families were freed and traveled in 1846. Randolph had provided that those over the age of 40 were given 10 acres each for resettlement. A contemporary history described the Rumley settlement: "There are 400 Negroes (half the population of Van Buren Township) as prosperous as their white neighbors and equal to the whites in morals, religion and intelligence." In 1900 survivors and descendants formed Randolph Ex-Slaves Association (later Randolph Slave Association) and held their first reunion at Midway Park near Piqua. Sixty-two of the original settlers attended who had been born in Virginia into slavery. After being manumitted, they had come to Ohio as small children with their families. They were called the "Old Dominions" after the nickname of Virginia; the "Buckeyes" were those descendants born in Ohio. Over the years, the reunions were also held at Troy and the Shelby County Fairgrounds, with 100-300 attending.

Geography
Terrain of Shelby County consists of low rolling hills, entirely devoted to agriculture or urban development. The Great Miami River enters from Logan County near the county's midpoint, and flows west-southwest-southward to exit into Miami County near the midpoint of its south borderline. The county's highest point (1,149'/351 meters ASL) is at its SE corner, where it abuts Champaign and Miami counties.

Adjacent counties

 Auglaize County - north
 Logan County - east
 Champaign County - southeast
 Miami County - south
 Darke County - west
 Mercer County - northwest

Demographics

2000 census
As of the 2000 United States Census, there were 49,423 people, 18,488 households, and 2.63 persons per household, with 20,185 housing units. The county's racial makeup was 95.1% White, 2.1% Black or African American, 0.2% Native American, 1.0% Asian, 0.1% Pacific Islander, 1.4% from other races, and 1.6% from two or more races. 0.1% of the population were Hispanic or Latino of any race.

There were 18,488 households, out of which 36.90% had children under the age of 18 living with them, 60.70% were married couples living together, 9.30% had a female householder with no husband present, and 25.80% were non-families. 22.00% of all households were made up of individuals, and 8.90% had someone living alone who was 65 years of age or older. The average household size was 2.63 and the average family size was 3.13.

The county population contained 28.60% under the age of 18, 8.20% from 18 to 24, 29.30% from 25 to 44, 21.70% from 45 to 64, and 12.20% who were 65 years of age or older. The median age was 35 years. For every 100 females there were 98.60 males. For every 100 females age 18 and over, there were 96.40 males.

The median income for a household in the county was $48,475, and the median income for a family was $51,331. Males had a median income of $36,212 versus $24,470 for females. The per capita income for the county was $20,255. About 5.30% of families and 6.70% of the population were below the poverty line, including 8.30% of those under age 18 and 5.30% of those age 65 or over.

2010 census
As of the 2010 United States Census, there were 49,423 people, 18,467 households, and 13,409 families in the county. The racial makeup of the county was 94.7% white, 1.9% black or African American, 0.9% Asian, 0.2% American Indian, 0.1% Pacific islander, 0.5% from other races, and 1.9% from two or more races. Those of Hispanic or Latino origin made up 1.3% of the population. In terms of ancestry, 39.8% were German, 11.0% were Irish, 9.2% were American, and 7.8% were English.

Of the 18,467 households, 36.0% had children under the age of 18 living with them, 56.9% were married couples living together, 10.4% had a female householder with no husband present, 27.4% were non-families, and 23.0% of all households were made up of individuals. The average household size was 2.64 and the average family size was 3.09. The median age was 37.9 years.

The median income for a household in the county was $48,475 and the median income for a family was $58,473. Males had a median income of $41,924 versus $30,487 for females. The per capita income for the county was $21,948. About 8.9% of families and 11.9% of the population were below the poverty line, including 18.1% of those under age 18 and 7.5% of those age 65 or over.

Politics
Prior to 1940, Shelby County was a Democratic stronghold in presidential elections, with every Democratic presidential candidate from 1856 to 1936 aside from Al Smith in 1928. But starting with the 1940 election, the county has become a Republican stronghold in presidential elections, with Harry S. Truman in 1948 and Lyndon B. Johnson in 1964 being the lone Democrats to win the county since then.

|}

Communities

City
 Sidney (county seat)

Villages

 Anna
 Botkins
 Fort Loramie
 Jackson Center
 Kettlersville
 Lockington
 Minster (part)
 Port Jefferson
 Russia

Townships

 Clinton
 Cynthian
 Dinsmore
 Franklin
 Green
 Jackson
 Loramie
 McLean
 Orange
 Perry
 Salem
 Turtle Creek
 Van Buren
 Washington

Census-designated places
 Newport

Unincorporated communities

 Ballou
 Dawson
 Depew
 Hardin
 Houston
 Kirkwood
 Maplewood
 McCartyville
 Montra
 Mount Jefferson
 Newbern
 Oran
 Pasco
 Pemberton
 Plattsville
 Rumley
 St. Patrick
 Swanders
 Tawawa
 Uno

Notable people
 Jared Hoying, Professional Baseball Player
 Paul Lauterbur, chemist and Nobel Prize laureate
 J. Edward Russell, former U.S. Representative from Ohio
 Bill Steinkemper, American football player

See also
 National Register of Historic Places listings in Shelby County, Ohio

References

External links

 County website
 Census Information for Shelby County, Ohio

 
1819 establishments in Ohio
Populated places established in 1819